Roger Evans may refer to:
 Roger Evans (London politician) (born 1964), member of the London Assembly
 Roger Evans (British Army officer) (1886–1968), British Army officer
 Roger Evans (footballer) (1879–?), Welsh footballer
 Roger Kenneth Evans (born 1947), British politician, MP for Monmouth
 Roger Evans, a character in the TV series Sister, Sister